Concord Township is the name of some places in the U.S. state of Pennsylvania:
Concord Township, Butler County, Pennsylvania
Concord Township, Delaware County, Pennsylvania
Concord Township, Erie County, Pennsylvania

Pennsylvania township disambiguation pages